Amerind or Amerindian may refer to:
Amerindian or Amerind peoples, chiefly anthropological terms for indigenous peoples of the Americas 
See: Native American name controversy
Amerind languages, a hypothetical higher-language family

See also
Amerind Foundation, a non-profit, museum and archaeological research facility
Genetic history of indigenous peoples of the Americas
Paleo-Indians